Inosperma adaequatum, until 2019 known as Inocybe adaequata, is a species of fungus of the family Inocybaceae found in North America and Europe.

References

adaequatum
Fungi described in 1879
Fungi of North America
Fungi of Europe